The Toronto International Film Festival People's Choice Award for Documentaries is an annual film award, presented by the Toronto International Film Festival to the film rated as the year's most popular documentary film with festival audiences. The award was first introduced in 2009; prior to its introduction, documentary films were eligible for the Toronto International Film Festival People's Choice Award.

Process
The voting process is the same as for the feature film People's Choice: at each documentary film screening, attendees are invited to "vote" for the film by leaving their ticket stubs in voting boxes outside the theatre after the show.

Winners

See also
Hot Docs Audience Awards

References

People's Choice Documentaries
Audience awards
Canadian documentary film awards